"A journey of a thousand miles begins with a single step" is a common saying that originated from a Chinese proverb. The quotation is from Chapter 64 of the Dao De Jing ascribed to Laozi, although it is also erroneously ascribed to his contemporary Confucius. This saying teaches that even the longest and most difficult ventures have a starting point; something which begins with one first step.

The phrase is also translated as A journey of a thousand miles begins from under the feet "and a thousand mile journey beings where one stands"

References 

 Chinese proverbs
 Taoist philosophy
Quotations from literature